The 2019 French motorcycle Grand Prix was the fifth round of the 2019 MotoGP season. It was held at the Bugatti Circuit in Le Mans on 19 May 2019.

Classification

MotoGP

  – Karel Abraham and Joan Mir started the race from the pit lane for crash during warm-up lap. His place of grid was left vacant. 
 Karel Abraham was black-flagged for leaving pit lane aboard a spare bike after leader crossed the finish line at the end of lap 1.

Moto2

Moto3

Championship standings after the race

MotoGP

Moto2

Moto3

Notes

References

External links

French
Motorcycle Grand Prix
French motorcycle Grand Prix
French motorcycle Grand Prix